Kader Çelik (born 1 January 2001) is a Turkish Paralympian goalball player having visual impairment. She is a member of the national team taking part at the 2020 Summer Paralympics.

She won the silver medal at the 2017 European Goalball Championships in Lahti, Finland. At the 2018 Goalball World Championships in Malmö, Sweden, she won the silver medal. She played with the national team, which won the gold medal at the 2019 European Goalball Championship in Rostock, Germany.

Honours

International
  2017 IBSA Goalball European Championships Div. A in Lahti, Finland.
  2018 Goalball World Championships in Malmö, Sweden.
  2019 IBSA Goalball European Champişonship in Rostock, Germany
  2020 Summer Paralympics in Rio de Janeiro, Brazil.

References

2001 births
Living people
Sportspeople from Ağrı
Turkish blind people
Turkish sportswomen
Female goalball players
Turkish goalball players
Goalball players at the 2020 Summer Paralympics
Paralympic goalball players of Turkey